Swan Island is an island in the Detroit River. It is in Wayne County, in southeast Michigan. A 1982 report from the U.S. Fish and Wildlife Service said that white bass had been spawning at the island since the 1920s.

References

Islands of Wayne County, Michigan
Islands of the Detroit River
River islands of Michigan
Michigan populated places on the Detroit River